The Revd George Christopher Stead (April 9, 1913 – May 28, 2008) was British patristic scholar and Church of England clergyman who was the last Ely Professor of Divinity at the University of Cambridge. He is best known for his work on the philosophy of the Church Fathers.  He studied under G.E. Moore and Ludwig Wittgenstein while an undergraduate at Cambridge.  His academic career was combined with ministry as a college chaplain and then residentiary Canon of the Ely Cathedral; he also served briefly as Curate of St. John's, Newcastle upon Tyne in 1939.

Field of research

Stead was particularly interested in the application of the Aristotelian concept of substance (ousia) to Christian theology and in the use of the term 'homoousios', initially in a context deemed heretical (in the teaching of Paul of Samosata) by the Council of Antioch (AD 268), subsequently more authoritatively by the Council of Nicaea (AD 325), which in turn gave rise to over half a century of heated discussion. His 1977 book Divine Substance is widely cited among patristic scholars. Stead's interest (taking in en route Marius Victorinus and Gregory of Nyssa) extended to Augustine and John Philoponus' use of the concept.

Stead made numerous contributions to better understanding of the teaching of Arius, the Alexandrian theologian in opposition to whose teaching the Council of Nicaea adopted the term 'homoousios'. He also wrote on Athanasius, Gregory of Nyssa, and Valentinian Gnosticism, as well as on general philosophical issues such as the freedom of the will and concept of mind in the Church Fathers. See the two volumes of his collected papers which are listed below.

Academic career

Marlborough College, graduated 1933
King's College, Cambridge, B.A., 1935
New College, Oxford, ?
Cuddesdon College, Ordained Deacon 1938, Priest 1941
King's College, Cambridge, Lecturer in Divinity, 1938–1949
Eton College, Assistant Master, 1940–1944
Keble College, Oxford, Fellow and Chaplain, 1949–1971
University of Cambridge, Ely Professor of Divinity, 1971–1980
University of Cambridge, D.Litt., 1978
Elected Fellow of the British Academy, 1980

Works

 Divine Substance, 1977
 Substance and Illusion in the Christian Fathers, 1985 (collected papers)
 Philosophie und Theologie I: Die Zeit der Alten Kirche (Theologische Wissenschaft), 1990
 Philosophy in Christian Antiquity, 1996
 Doctrine and Philosophy in Early Christianity, 2000 (collected papers)
 "Kategorienlehre", Reallexikon fûr Antike und Christentum, Band XX, Stuttgart, 2004.
 Also: The Birth of the Steam Locomotive, 2002

Festschrift
Christian Faith and Greek Philosophy in Late Antiquity: Essays in Tribute to George Christopher Stead (ed. L. R. Wickham & C.P. Bammel), 1993

References

Obituary in The Independent
Obituary in The Telegraph

1913 births
2008 deaths
Ely Professors of Divinity
British theologians
Alumni of King's College, Cambridge
Fellows of the British Academy
Fellows of Keble College, Oxford
20th-century English Anglican priests